Myrlaea serratella is a species of snout moth in the genus Myrlaea. It was described by Émile Louis Ragonot in 1893 and is known from Algeria (including Mardin, the type location).

References

Moths described in 1893
Phycitini
Endemic fauna of Algeria
Moths of Africa
Taxa named by Émile Louis Ragonot